Narcissus bulbocodium, the petticoat daffodil or hoop-petticoat daffodil, is a species of flowering plant in the family Amaryllidaceae, native to southern and western France, Portugal, and Spain. Some sources say that the species is also native to Morocco, but this is based on populations formerly thought to be varieties of N. bulbocodium but now regarded as separate species.

Description 
The flower is unusual in that the central trumpet (corona) is exceptionally large in relation to the outer section (perianth) consisting of tiny pointed segments.
The specific epithet bulbocodium means "woolly bulb". At 12 mm it has the smallest floral diameter amongst Narcissus.

Hybrids
Narcissus bulbocodium is a parent of several hybrids, including:-
N. × abilioi Fern.Casas (N. bulbocodium × N. jonquilla)
N. × brevitubulosus A.Fern. (N. bulbocodium × N. asturiensis)
N. × montcaunicus Fern.Casas (N. bulbocodium × N. eugeniae)
N. × lopezii Fern.Casas (N. obvallaris × N. bulbocodium)
N. × rozeirae Fern.Casas & Pérez-Chisc. (N. bulbocodium × N. pallidulus)
N. × barrae Fern.Casas (N. cantabricus 'Redouté' × N. bulbocodium)

Cultivation
Narcissus bulbocodium is widely planted in gardens, and can be naturalised in grass. It requires relatively dry conditions during the summer dormant period, so is suitable for planting beneath deciduous trees.  Numerous varieties and cultivars exist, including N. bulbocodium subsp. bulbocodium var. conspicuus (pale yellow flowers) and 'Golden Bells', a vigorous cultivar with long-lasting deep yellow flowers.

Narcissus bulbocodium has gained the Royal Horticultural Society's Award of Garden Merit.

Gallery

References

bulbocodium
Flora of France
Flora of North Africa
Flora of Spain
Flora of Portugal
Garden plants
Plants described in 1753
Taxa named by Carl Linnaeus